Hedaya Malak Wahba (born 21 April 1993) is an Egyptian taekwondo practitioner. She participated in the 2012, the 2016 Olympics and won a bronze medal in 2016, and the 2020 Olympics winning Egypt the gold medal in the tournament.

Career
Malak took up taekwondo aged six, following her elder brother; she was joined by her younger brother. She ranked first in the Giza governorate championship before winning Egypt's championship at 14 years old.

At the London 2012 Olympics, she competed in the Taekwondo women's 57 kg and qualified for the quarterfinals by defeating Robin Cheong of New Zealand in the round of 16. She was defeated at the quarterfinals by Marlène Harnois of France.

She qualified for the 2016 Summer Olympics in Rio de Janeiro, ranking third in the WTF Olympic Rankings as of December 2015. Malak passed through the early rounds, defeating Doris Patiño and Mayu Hamada before losing out in the semifinals to Eva Calvo of Spain. Malak then won the bronze medal after defeating Raheleh Asemani of Belgium in the Repechage.

She represented Egypt at the 2020 Summer Olympics in the –67 kg category. She lost in the quarter final to Lauren Williams of Great Britain. Hedaya then won the bronze medal after defeating Malia Paseka of Tonga followed by Paige McPherson of the United States in the Repechage

See also 
 Muslim women in sport

References

External links
 

1993 births
Living people
Sportspeople from Cairo
Egyptian female taekwondo practitioners
Olympic taekwondo practitioners of Egypt
Taekwondo practitioners at the 2012 Summer Olympics
Taekwondo practitioners at the 2016 Summer Olympics
Taekwondo practitioners at the 2020 Summer Olympics
Medalists at the 2016 Summer Olympics
Medalists at the 2020 Summer Olympics
Olympic bronze medalists for Egypt
Olympic medalists in taekwondo
Mediterranean Games bronze medalists for Egypt
Competitors at the 2013 Mediterranean Games
African Games gold medalists for Egypt
African Games medalists in taekwondo
African Games silver medalists for Egypt
Mediterranean Games medalists in taekwondo
Competitors at the 2011 All-Africa Games
Competitors at the 2015 African Games
Competitors at the 2019 African Games
Competitors at the 2018 Mediterranean Games
African Taekwondo Championships medalists
Islamic Solidarity Games competitors for Egypt
Islamic Solidarity Games medalists in taekwondo
21st-century Egyptian women